Marc Robert Boerigter (born May 4, 1978) is a former professional Canadian and American football player. He is one of 13 players to have caught a 99-yard reception in the NFL.

Early life and college football career 
Born in Hastings, Nebraska, Boerigter attended Hastings High School. He played college football for hometown Hastings College, an NAIA school.  As a wide receiver for the Broncos, Boerigter caught 93 passes for 1,902 yards during his collegiate career, setting team records with a 20.5 yard average and 30 touchdowns.  Boerigter was named a two-time All-Nebraska-Iowa Athletic Conference selection.

Boerigter graduated from Hastings with a bachelor's degree in Human Resources.

His father is Bob Boerigter, who served as the Mid-America Intercollegiate Athletics Association commissioner from 2010 to 2017.

Professional football career 
Boerigter began his professional career in the Canadian Football League in 2000 with the Calgary Stampeders.

Boerigter joined the Kansas City Chiefs of the National Football League in 2002, where he enjoyed a successful NFL rookie season, catching 20 passes for 420 yards (a 21.0 average that led the NFL among those with 15 or more catches) with eight touchdowns.  He also holds the record, along with twelve other receivers, for the longest pass caught in the NFL, 99 yards, from Kansas City quarterback Trent Green, in a December 22, 2002 game against the San Diego Chargers.

Boerigter was signed by the Green Bay Packers in the 2006 offseason, but was released prior to the start of the season.  He immediately signed a free agent contract with the Indianapolis Colts but was once again released prior to the start of the 2006 NFL season.

Following his release from the Colts, Boerigter signed a contract and returned to his former CFL team, the Calgary Stampeders on November 20, 2006.

Boerigter began the Stampeders 2007 season as a back-up slotback and wide receiver, before eventually making the Stamps' starting lineup.  Boerigter was released by the Calgary Stampeders on August 26, 2007.

Following his release by the Stampeders, Boerigter was quickly signed by the Toronto Argonauts, who outbid the competing BC Lions for Boerigter's services. Toronto released him following the 2007 season and he was not signed as a free agent in 2008.

Boerigter was inducted into the Hastings College Athletic Hall of Fame in 2008.

Post-football career
In September 2015, Boerigter accepted a job offer from the Mid-America Intercollegiate Athletic Association, an NCAA Division II conference, to do color commentary.

References

External links 
 ESPN stats

1978 births
Living people
American football wide receivers
American players of Canadian football
Canadian football wide receivers
Calgary Stampeders players
Hastings Broncos football players
Kansas City Chiefs players
Toronto Argonauts players
People from Hastings, Nebraska
Players of American football from Nebraska
Hastings Senior High School (Nebraska) alumni